Benjamin Johnson (born June 7, 1994) is an American professional ice hockey player who is currently playing for HC Nové Zámky of the Slovak Extraliga. 

He was selected by the New Jersey Devils in the 3rd round (90th overall) of the 2012 NHL Entry Draft.

Playing career

Amateur
Johnson attended Calumet High School in Calumet, Michigan where he played on the high school hockey team. He was recognized for his outstanding play during the 2010–11 season when he was named Michigan's Mr. Hockey as the Top High School Player in Michigan, becoming only the second junior to win the award (Justin Abdelkader won the award as a junior in 2004).

With the 2011–12 season, Johnson joined the Windsor Spitfires of the Ontario Hockey League. Playing three seasons of major junior hockey with the Spitfires, Johnson scored 66 goals and 62 assists for 128 points, while earning 106 penalty minutes, in 191 games played.

Professional
On April 3, 2014, Johnson signed an amateur tryout contract with the Albany Devils, and played five games with the AHL team near the end of the 2013–14 season. On May 20, 2014, the New Jersey Devils of the National Hockey League signed Johnson to a three-year entry-level contract.

On December 7, 2018, having served his prison sentence, Johnson resumed his professional career during the 2018–19 season, signing a contract with the Cincinnati Cyclones of the ECHL.

Following a two-season stint with the Cyclones, Johnson sat out for the COVID-19 pandemic affected 2020–21 season. He made his return to the ECHL during the 2021–22 season, agreeing to a contract with the Kansas City Mavericks on December 5, 2021.

Sexual assault conviction
In March 2013, Johnson was charged with two counts of sexual assault in connection with two separate incidents that allegedly took place in Windsor. The first occurred against a 16-year-old girl in the washroom of Mynt nightclub during the Spitfires' end of season St. Patrick's Day party. Johnson forced her to perform oral sex in a bathroom stall while she was intoxicated before he raped her, causing vaginal bleeding. During the course of the investigation, a second woman, aged 20, came forward and told police that she had also been sexually assaulted by Johnson in the washroom of a second bar weeks prior. He was found guilty on September 1, 2016, of the charge related to events at the Mynt nightclub. That same day, the Devils initiated the process to terminate Johnson's contract. On October 25, 2016, he was sentenced to a 3-year prison term for the sexual assault.

Career statistics

Awards and honors

References

External links

1994 births
21st-century American criminals
Adirondack Thunder players
Albany Devils players
American men's ice hockey left wingers
American male criminals
American people convicted of sexual assault
American people imprisoned abroad
American prisoners and detainees
American sportspeople convicted of crimes
Cincinnati Cyclones (ECHL) players
Crime in Ontario
Fargo Force players
Kansas City Mavericks players
Living people
New Jersey Devils draft picks
Orlando Solar Bears (ECHL) players
Prisoners and detainees of Canada
USA Hockey National Team Development Program players
Windsor Spitfires players
HC Nové Zámky players
Sportspeople convicted of crimes
American expatriate ice hockey players in Canada
American expatriate ice hockey players in Slovakia